Commerce Bancshares, Inc. (NASDAQ: CBSH) is a registered bank holding company based in Missouri, United States, with primary hubs in Kansas City and St. Louis. It is the corporate parent of Commerce Bank, which offers a diversified line of financial services, including business and personal banking, wealth management and investments through its affiliated companies.

Commerce operates more than 250 branch and ATM locations across Missouri, Kansas, Illinois, Oklahoma, and Colorado and also has operating subsidiaries involved in mortgage banking, credit-related insurance, venture capital and real estate activities.

As of March 31, 2022, Commerce Bank was the 61st largest commercial bank in the United States, as reported by the Federal Reserve Bank. Commerce Bank ranked 34th on Forbes list of America's Best Banks 2022. Forbes has named Commerce Bank to its America's Best Banks list for 13 consecutive years.

History
Commerce was founded by Francis Reid Long with $10,000 in capital in 1865, just as communities were rebuilding after the Civil War. Originally known as the Kansas City Savings Association, it was acquired in 1881 by Dr. William Stone Woods and renamed the National Bank of Commerce, claiming at the time to be the largest bank west of Chicago.[1] Harry Truman, the 33rd President of the United States, worked as a clerk and cashier at the bank in the early 1900s. When describing Dr. Woods, Truman once said, "There are dozens of stories about his close accounting of the nickels and pennies, but if he chose to back a man, he stayed with him through thick and thin if that man had energy and character.[2] Dr. Woods would go on to transform the Kansas City bank into a modern financial institution.

Truman's housemate at the time was fellow Commerce employee Arthur Eisenhower, brother of future war hero and President Dwight D. Eisenhower. Arthur went on to work at Commerce for more than 50 years.[2]

The bank became Commerce Bank in 1903 with William Thornton Kemper Sr. as its first president. Kemper set up one of his sons, James M. Kemper, at Commerce and his other son, Rufus Crosby Kemper Sr., at the competing City Center Bank, which later became UMB Financial Corporation. Members of the Kemper family still play a dominant role at both banks. They also are a major force in Missouri philanthropies, with their names attached to numerous buildings throughout the state, including Kemper Arena.

In 1928, Commerce opened the nation's first 24-hour banking transit department where checks or transit items drawn from out-of-town banks could be cleared and collected.[2] The bank was an early adopter in other ways as well. In 1955, it installed the latest moving "electric stairs" in the Walnut Lobby of its Kansas City headquarters. In that same lobby, President Bill Clinton announced his 1994 plan for welfare reform, using the occasion to recognize the bank's participation in "welfare-to-work" programs.[2]

After World War II, Commerce Bank continued to play an important role in the Midwest's growth. It funded business growth, working with H&R Block, Sprint (originally called United Utilities), and Trans World Airlines, which had its main overhaul base at Kansas City International Airport. In 1954, the Commerce Trust Company allowed Walt Disney and his wife, Lillian, to take out a $60,000 loan against Disney's life insurance policy to help fund the development of a new theme park Disney envisioned. Disneyland opened in California a year later, and by the end of its first year in operation, the park had already attracted 3.6 million guests.[3]From the 1960s to the 1990s, Commerce grew alongside the American economy, expanding throughout Missouri, Kansas, and Illinois. In 1968, Commerce became the first bank in Missouri to enter the credit card business.[2] In 1969, Commerce helped Ewing Kauffman, the owner of Marion Laboratories buy the Kansas City Royals. Commerce remains the Royals' bank.[2] After a young Johnny Morris opened a bait and tackle shop in the bank of his father's liquor store in Springfield, Missouri, Commerce provided the line of credit he needed in 1974 to open a second store in a chain known today throughout North America as Bass Pro Shops.[2] When the financial crisis caused a recession in 2008, Commerce was the country's sixth largest bank to decline financial assistance from the U.S. Treasury Department's Troubled Asset Relief Program, or TARP.[4]

Appearing regularly on Forbes' list of America's Best Banks, Commerce later added Colorado and Oklahoma to its banking footprint, with additional commercial offices throughout the Midwest and commercial payments services available in 48 states.

Lines of business
Commercial Banking – Commerce Bank serves more than 12,000 businesses through its commercial banking and payments businesses. The bank's commercial services include corporate lending, merchant and commercial bank card products, payment solutions, leasing and international services, as well as business and government deposit, investment, and cash management services. The commercial banking business contributed 53 percent of Commerce Bank's pre-tax income in 2021.

Consumer Banking – Commerce Bank's consumer banking serves more than 800,000 households from more than 250 branch and ATM locations in its retail network, along with online and mobile banking. The bank's consumer services include consumer checking, installment loans, personal mortgages and consumer debit and credit bank cards. The consumer banking business contributed 23 percent of Commerce Bank's pre-tax income in 2021.

Wealth Management – Commerce Bank provides investment management, financial planning, trust and private banking services to individuals and institutions through Commerce Financial Advisors and Commerce Trust a division of Commerce Bank. With more than $58.6 billion in total assets under administration on June 30, 2022, Commerce Trust ranked 18th in bank-managed trust companies in 2021, according to S&P Global Market intelligence. Commerce Bank's wealth management businesses contributed 23 percent of the bank's pre-tax income in 2021.

Awards and recognition
In 2022, Newsweek named Commerce Bank one of America's Best Banks for Best Customer Service for the second consecutive year. The award recognizes banks with the fewest problems reported to the Consumer Financial Protection Bureau, timely response rate to complaints, a helpful mobile app and a variety of dedicated customer service lines.

In 2022, Forbes named Commerce Bank one of America's Best Banks for the 13th consecutive year. Commerce ranked 34th in the 2022 ranking.

Other Forbes rankings included:

 World's Best Banks 2022 – Commerce Bank is one of only 75 banks in the United States to be recognized on the Forbes list, which includes 500 banks from 28 countries around the world.
 Global 2000 – 2021 – Commerce Bancshares ranked 1,903 – The Global 2000 ranks the world's largest companies based on assets, market value, sales and profit.
 America's Best Midsize Employers 2022 – Ranked 268th
 Best Employers in Missouri – Ranked 49th

Global Finance named The Private Bank at Commerce Trust the 2021 Best U.S. Regional Private Bank in the Midwest. The award recognizes The Private Bank's efforts to stretch its capabilities during the pandemic to work with clients experiencing cash flow difficulties.

Human Rights Campaign's 2022 Corporate Equality Index (CEI) — Commerce Bank received a score of 90 on the nation's foremost benchmarking survey and report that measures corporate policies and practices related to LGBTQ workplace equality.

References

External links
 

Banks based in Missouri
Companies based in Kansas City, Missouri
Companies listed on the Nasdaq
Kemper family
American companies established in 1865
Banks established in 1865
American brands
Financial services companies of the United States
Holding companies
Companies based in Oklahoma
Companies based in Chicago
Companies based in Colorado